Liberia – United States relations are bilateral relations between Liberia and the United States.

History 

U.S. relations with Liberia date back to 1819, when the US Congress appropriated $100,000 for the establishment of Liberia. However, although Liberia declared its independence in 1847, United States senators from southern states prevented its recognition as a sovereign nation until 1862, during the American Civil War, after the entire Southern delegation in Congress had departed. The two nations shared very close diplomatic, economic, and military ties until the 1990s.

U.S. assists Americo-Liberians
The United States had a long history of intervening in Liberia's internal affairs; sending naval vessels to help the ruling Americo-Liberian minority suppress insurrections by indigenous tribes in 1821, 1843, 1876, 1910 and 1915. By 1909, Liberia faced serious external threats to its sovereignty from the European colonial powers over unpaid foreign loans and annexation of its borderlands.

President William Howard Taft devoted a considerable portion of his First Annual Message to Congress (December 7, 1909) to the Liberian question, noting the close historical ties between the two countries that gave an opening for a wider intervention:

 "It will be remembered that the interest of the United States in the Republic of Liberia springs from the historical fact of the foundation of the Republic by the colonization of American citizens of the African race. In an early treaty with Liberia, there is a provision under which the United States may be called upon for advice or assistance. Pursuant to this provision and in the spirit of the moral relationship of the United States to Liberia, that Republic last year asked this Government to lend assistance in the solution of certain of their national problems, and hence the Commission was sent across the ocean on two cruisers."

In 1912 the U.S. arranged a 40-year international loan of $1.7 million, against which Liberia had to agree to four Western powers (America, Britain, France, and Germany) controlling Liberian Government revenues for the next 14 years, until 1926. American administration of the border police also stabilized the frontier with Sierra Leone and checked French ambitions to annex more Liberian territory. The American Navy also established a coaling station in Liberia, cementing its presence. When World War I started, Liberia declared war on Germany and expelled its resident German merchants, who constituted the country's largest investors and trading partners. Liberia suffered economically as a result.

In 1926, the Liberian government gave a concession to the American rubber company Firestone to start the world's largest rubber plantation at Harbel, Liberia. At the same time, Firestone arranged a $5 million private loan to Liberia.

In the 1930s Liberia was again virtually bankrupt, and, after some American pressure, agreed to an assistance plan from the League of Nations.  As part of this plan, two key officials of the League were placed in positions to "advise" the Liberian government.

Ever since President Taft, American support for Liberian independence, prosperity, and reform were priorities. The major American role was training the Liberian army, known as the  Liberian Frontier Force, using elite black officers from the regular United States Army.  The American presence warned away European imperial powers, defeated a series of local rebellions, and helped bring in American technology to develop the resource-rich interior. Democracy was not a high priority, as the 15,000 Americano-Liberians had full control of 750,000 locals. The Krus and Greboe tribes remained highly reluctant to accept control from Monrovia, but they were not powerful enough to overcome a regime strongly supported by the United States Army and Navy.  The American officers including Charles Young, Benjamin Davis,  and others were skilled at training recruits, helping the government minimize corruption, and advocating loans from American corporations while monitoring the resulting flow of funds.

World War II
  
During World War II, Liberia joined the Allies and Monrovia was host to important Allied logistics bases. Firestone was a large munitions supplier for the Allies.

Since 1970
Liberian and United States relationships became strained between 1971 and 1980 due to Liberian president William Tolbert's establishment of diplomatic relations with the Soviet Union and other Eastern Bloc countries. In 1978, United States president Jimmy Carter made the first official presidential visit to Liberia.

During the 1980s, the United States forged especially close ties with Liberia as part of a Cold War effort to suppress Communist movements in Africa. Samuel Doe's government was seen by American strategists as being especially important to their Cold War policies in Africa and his government received between $500 million and $1.3 billion during the 1980s from the U.S. through direct and indirect channels. Furthermore,  Liberia was home to a relay station for Voice of America, a large navigation tower, and the CIA's main African base for the majority of this period.

The rise of Charles Taylor's government, the Liberian Civil War, regional instability and human rights abuses interrupted the previously close relations between Liberia and the United States. Charles Taylor's election in 1997 was monitored by the Economic Community of West African States and the United States officially recognized the result and the new government. However, during Taylor's presidency, the United States cut direct financial and military aid to the Liberian government, withdrew Peace Corps operations, imposed a travel ban on senior Liberian Government officials, and frequently criticized Charles Taylor's government.  Much of the Liberian-American tension from this period stems from the Liberian government's acknowledged support for the Revolutionary United Front, a rebel group in Sierra Leone and surrounding region. Due to intense pressure from the international community and the United States, along with Liberian civic organizations like the Women of Liberia Mass Action for Peace, Charles Taylor resigned his office on August 11, 2003.

The resignation and exile of Charles Taylor in 2003 brought changes in diplomatic ties between the United States and Liberia. On July 30, 2003, the United States proposed a UN Security Council draft resolution to authorize the deployment of a multi-national stabilization force. Despite stated concerns about prosecution in the International Criminal Court, United States president George W. Bush sent 200 marines to Monrovia's airport to support the peace-keeping effort. The United States also deployed warships along Liberia's coast as part of the stabilization effort. The United States committed $1.16 billion to Liberia between the years of 2004 and 2006.

USAID
The United States Agency for International Development (USAID) implements the U.S. Government's development assistance program. USAID's post-conflict rebuilding strategy focuses on reintegration and is increasingly moving towards a longer-term development focus. Rehabilitation efforts include national and community infrastructure projects, such as building roads, refurbishing government buildings, and training Liberians in vocational skills. USAID also funds basic education programs, improving education for children, focusing on girls, and training teachers. In the health area, USAID programs include primary health care clinics, HIV/AIDS prevention, and a large malaria program. USAID supports rule of law programs, establishing legal aid clinics and victim abuse centers, training judges and lawyers, community peace building and reconciliation efforts, and anti-corruption projects to promote transparency and accountability in public sector entities. USAID is also providing support to strengthen the legislature and other political processes. USAID is strengthening civil society's role in delivering services and advocating good governance. Total USAID funding program for these programs in FY 2007 was $65.9 million.

In 2009, a 17.5 million dollar contract was offered to Liberia with the International Foundation for Electoral Systems as the conduit. This money was meant to support the 2011 general elections and 2014 Senate elections.

U.S. officials
Principal U.S. Officials include:
 Ambassador: Michael A. McCarthy
 Deputy Chief of Mission: Joel Maybury
 Management Counselor: John Crippen
 Political/Economic Counselor: Joel Kopp
 Public Affairs Officer: Sean Boda
 Consular Officer: Ramona Crippen
 USAID Director: Jim Wright
 Defense Attaché: Michael Clark

The U.S. Embassy is located in Monrovia.

See also 
 Foreign relations of the United States
 Foreign relations of Liberia
 Africa-United States relations
 List of ambassadors of the United States to Liberia

References

Further reading
 Akpan, Monday B. "Black imperialism: Americo-Liberian rule over the African peoples of Liberia, 1841-1964." Canadian Journal of African Studies (1973): 217–236. in JSTOR
 Allen, William E. "Liberia and the Atlantic World in the Nineteenth Century: Convergence and Effects." History in Africa (2010) 37#1 pp : 7-49.
 Bixler, Raymond W. The Foreign Policy of the United States in Liberia (New York: Pageant Press Inc., 1957)
 Chalk, F. "The Anatomy of an Investment: Firestone’s 1927 Loan to Liberia," Canadian Journal of African Studies (1967) 1#1 pp: 12–32.
 Duignan, P., and L. H. Gann. The United States and Africa: A History (Cambridge University Press, 1984)
 Feick, Greer. Red, White and Blue Rubber: American Involvement in the Liberian Slavery Crisis, 1928-1934 (undergraduate senior thesis 2011). online
 Gershoni, Yekutiel. Black Colonialism: The Americo-Liberian Scramble for the Hinterland (London: Westview Press, 1985)
 Hyman, Lester S. United States policy towards Liberia, 1822 to 2003 (2003)  online free

 Lyon, Judson M. "Informal Imperialism: The United States in Liberia, 1897–1912." Diplomatic History (1981) 5#3 pp 221–243.
 Rosenberg, Emily S. "The Invisible Protectorate: The United States, Liberia, and the Evolution of Neocolonialism, 1909–40." Diplomatic History (1985) 9#3 pp 191–214.
 Shellum, Brian G. African American Officers in Liberia: A Pestiferous Rotation, 1910–1942 (2018) excerpt

External links 
History of Liberia - U.S. relations
 Embassy of Liberia in the United States

 

 
Bilateral relations of the United States
United States
Relations of colonizer and former colony